Hi, How Are You is a third-person platform game that is based on the art and music of Daniel Johnston.  It was developed by Peter Franco and Stephen Broumley of Dr Fun Fun and Smashing Studios for the iPhone and iPod Touch. Players control Jeremiah the frog and navigate platform mazes in order to win back his true love from Satan.

Gameplay
In Hi, How Are You, the player takes the control over Jeremiah the Innocent. He is based on a character from the Johnston's mural on the University of Texas campus. At first, he starts off as a human but is changed into a frog by Satan.

The main goal is to direct Jeremiah along the path by tilting the device without falling off. To complete a level, all green blocks must be touched before proceeding to the exit. In order to earn a silver trophy, the player must touch all the green blocks and red blocks or all the green blocks and beat the clock.  In order to earn a gold trophy, the player must touch all green blocks, all red blocks and beat the clock.  There are numerous obstacles and enemies that challenge the player in each level. The game also makes use of the device's accelerometer to control the characters.

Reception

Hi, How Are You was featured in The New York Times on September 28, 2009 and was described as "a psycho-religious version of Frogger". Pocket Gamer stated that "Hi, How Are You sets a new iPhone benchmark aesthetically". The soundtrack, consisting of several songs by Johnston, was praised by Slide to Play, noting that it adds to the game's tone.

References

External links
 The New York Times - 2nd Article
 Guardian UK News Article
 NPR News Article

2009 video games
IPod games
Platform games
IOS games
Christian video games
Video games based on real people
Daniel Johnston
Fiction about the Devil
Video games developed in the United States
Video games about amphibians
GameClub games
Single-player video games